Robert Green (born March 25, 1960) is an American former professional tennis player.

Career
Green spent his collegiate tennis years with Boston University, with a brief stint at the University of Texas. He was a Boston University MVP on three occasions and also served as team captain.
 
Beginning the 1984 season ranked outside the world's top 300, Green would finish the year ranked 39th and win the ATP Newcomer of the Year Award. His most noted performance came in the 1984 US Open, where he was the only qualifier to reach the round of 16. En route he had a win over 11th seed Juan Aguilera and when he was eliminated it was to the eventual champion, John McEnroe. In 1984 he also made the semi-finals in Tel Aviv and was a quarter-finalist in Livingston, Hong Kong and Johannesburg.

He was never able to replicate the consistent results he had in 1984 but he did make the semi-finals at San Francisco in 1985, beating world number 14 Eliot Teltscher along the way. The following year he reached quarter-finals in Toronto, Milan and Bristol. His only career title also came in 1986, which was in the men's doubles at the Livingston Open, partnering Wally Masur.

Grand Prix career finals

Doubles: 1 (1–0)

External links

References

1960 births
Living people
American male tennis players
Tennis people from Nebraska
Sportspeople from Omaha, Nebraska
Texas Longhorns men's tennis players